Henry C. Barnard was a member of the Wisconsin State Assembly. Barnard was born on January 19, 1837, in St. Charles County, Missouri. He was a merchant by trade. Barnard was a member of the Assembly during the 1870 and 1871 sessions. Previously, he had been an unsuccessful candidate in 1868, losing to William E. Rowe. He was a Democrat.

References

1837 births
Year of death missing
19th-century American merchants
Democratic Party members of the Wisconsin State Assembly
People from St. Charles County, Missouri